Ab Insaf Hoga is a 1995 Indian Hindi-language action film directed by Harish Shah, starring Mithun Chakraborty, Rekha, Rohini Hattangadi, Farooq Shaikh and Prem Chopra. The movie was released on 6 January 1995.

Plot
Janki (Rekha) lives a poor lifestyle in a small village consisting of her dad, Bhervi Prasad and her mom. She meets and falls in love with her school-teacher, Ramcharan, and both want to get married. Ramcharan's brother is opposed to this marriage as Bhervi is unable to pay any dowry, but the couple are turned out of Kalicharan (Raza Murad)'s house, and instead go to live with Ramcharan's friend, Ashok Mishra. Ashok attempts to molest Janki, and a fight breaks out between Ramsharan and Ashok, and they move back to Janki's village where she finds that her parents have killed themselves. They decide to live in the village where Janki gives birth to a baby, Khusboo. Ramcharan is then assaulted by Ashok and receives a head injury that leaves him paralyzed. Janki takes him to Bombay, finds a job as a laborer, and takes Ramcharan to see a doctor, it will cost her a lot of money. She approaches her employer, Girdharilal (Prem Chopra), who is willing to pay the entire cost of her husband's treatment provided she sleeps with him, when she refuses, she does not get any money and is instead molested. Ramcharan does recover a little, and goes to confront Girdharilal, but gets killed. The police refuse to register any complaint against Girdharilal. Alone, traumatized, and devastated Janki and Khusboo wander aimlessly. She gets into an accident with a car that belongs to Gaurishankar (Mithun Chakraborty), a local gangster with a good heart, who wants to be a Municipal Councillor. With Janki's help he does become a Councillor and both entrap Girdharilal, and then subsequently Ashok and Kalicharan, get them arrested on a variety of criminal charges and jailed. What Janki and Gaurishankar do not know is that the trio have gotten together in prison and have planned a devious scheme that will ensure that Janki gets killed - without implicating any one of them.

Cast
Mithun Chakraborty as Gaurishankar
Rekha as Jankidevi Prasad
Rohini Hattangadi as Judge
Farooq Shaikh as Ramcharan
Prem Chopra as Girdharilal
Shafi Inamdar as Ashok Mishra
Raza Murad as Kalicharan
Sulabha Deshpande as Kashibai
Javed Khan as Ashok's friend
Yunus Parvez as Bashir Khan
Harish Patel as Bansi, Mukadam
Shail Chaturvedias Builder Saxena
Parikshat Sahni as Inspector Khan
Himani Shivpuri as Mrs. Kalicharan
Rohini Hattangadi as  Judge
Ghanshyam Rohera as Manglu
Padma Rani as Mrs. B. Prasad
Ram Mohan as Bhairvi Prasad
Sahila Chadha as Sabina B. Khan
T. P. Jain as Sabina's father
Ashwini Kaushal as Monish Khana
Deepika Amin as Khushboo Prasad, Janakidevi Daughter

Soundtrack

References

External links
 

1995 films
1990s Hindi-language films
Mithun's Dream Factory films
Films shot in Ooty
Films scored by Anand–Milind
Indian action films